Hridayathil Sookshikkan is a 2005 Malayalam-language romance film directed by debutant Rajesh Pillai. Produced by Bose Varghese, the film had Kunchacko Boban and Bhavana playing the main characters. The plot was loosely based on the 2000 American film Meet the Parents. The film's soundtrack was composed by Mohan Sitara.

Plot
Sreenath works in an advertising firm in Bangalore. He meets a model Amritha and falls in love with her. He tries to win her over  but she says that her father has to approve him. Sreenath and Amritha go to their village in Kerala to influence him and win over her parents. But things go away after Amritha's father starts hating Sreenath due to his hyperactive and overenthusiastic nature. After all, his efforts to win him over go in vain.

Cast
 Kunchacko Boban as Sreenath/Sree
 Bhavana as Amrutha
 Harishree Ashokan as Mathen
 Nithya Das as Nanitha
 Bhanupriya as Nirmala
 Shamna Kasim as model
 Siddique
 Riza Bava 
 Kalaranjini
 Maya Viswanath
 Geetha Salam as Govindan
 Beena Anthony as Bhanu
 Krishnapriya as Athira

References

External links 
 

2000s Malayalam-language films
2005 films
Films directed by Rajesh Pillai
Films scored by Mohan Sithara